Smokin' Hearts & Broken Guns is the fifth studio album by American hard rock band Shaman's Harvest, released on September 16, 2014, through Mascot Label Group.

Track listing

References

External links
Smokin' Hearts & Broken Guns on iTunes
Smokin' Hearts & Broken Guns at AllMusic

2014 albums
Shaman's Harvest albums